Francois Viljoen (born May 16, 1981) is a former American rugby union fullback. He was a member of the United States national rugby union team that participated in the 2007 Rugby World Cup.

References

1981 births
Living people
Rugby union scrum-halves
Alumni of Pretoria Boys High School
American rugby union players
United States international rugby union players